St. Charles Public Schools is a school district headquartered in St. Charles, Minnesota, serving the cities of St. Charles, Elba, Minnesota and Utica, Minnesota.

It operates two schools: St. Charles High School and St. Charles Elementary School.

References

School districts in Minnesota
Education in Winona County, Minnesota